Khvostenko (from хвост meaning tail) is a gender-neutral Ukrainian surname that may refer to
Alexander Khvostenko-Khvostov (1895–1967), Ukrainian avant-garde artist 
Alexei Khvostenko (1940–2004), Russian avant-garde poet, singer-songwriter and artist
Oksana Khvostenko (born 1977), Ukrainian biathlete

See also
 
Khvostov

Ukrainian-language surnames